Haag is a common Germanic place-name and personal name, which originally meant "hedge" or "fence", hence "enclosed area", such as a fenced hamlet, park or wood. Also Hagen, Hägen. 

Haag may refer to:

Places

The Hague, in the Netherlands
Several places in Germany:
Haag, Upper Franconia in the district of Bayreuth, Bavaria (Postcode 95473)
Haag an der Amper in the district of Freising, Bavaria (Postcode 85410)
Haag in Oberbayern in the district of Mühldorf,  Bavaria (Postcode 83527)
Haag (Oberpfalz), near Hemau, Bavaria (Postcode 93155)
Haag (Hunsrück), part of the community of Morbach, Rhineland-Palatinate (Postcode 54497)
Haag (Dachau), a village belonging to Altomünster in the district of Dachau, Bavaria (Postcode 85250)
Schloss Haag, a castle near Geldern, NRW (Postcode 47608)
Haag (Sinntal), a hill in Hesse

Several places in Austria:
Haag am Hausruck, a market town in the district of Grieskirchen, Upper Austria (Postcode 4680)
Haag, Austria, a municipality in the Amstetten District, Lower Austria (Postcode 3350)
Haag (Rheintal), Switzerland, part of Sennwald in the Canton of St. Gallen (Postcode 9469)
Haag Township, Logan County, North Dakota, in the United States

People
Alfred Haag (1904–1982), German Communist and member of the resistance
Anna Haag (born 1986), Swedish cross country skier
Carl Haag (1820–1915), German-British painter
Emile Haag (born 1942) Luxembourgish historian, trade unionist 
Ernest van den Haag (1914–2002), Dutch-American sociologist best known for his contributions to the National Review
Ernest Haag (1866-1935), American entrepreneur who started the Mighty Haag Circus
Ervin Haág (1933–2018), Hungarian chess master
Jules Haag (1882–1953), French mathematician
Lina Haag (1907-2012) German anti-Fascist activist
Marty Haag (1934–2004), the news director at the ABC station, WFAA-TV, in Dallas, Texas
Rudolf Haag (1922-2016), German physicist, known for his contributions to the axiomatic formulation of quantum field theory
Matthew Haag, (born 1992) American professional Call of Duty player and internet personality

Other uses
Haag%27s theorem a theorem in quantum field theory (physics)